Bujruk Tarlaghatta is a village in Dharwad district of Karnataka, India.

Demographics
As of the 2011 Census of India there were 743 households in Bujruk Tarlaghatta and a total population of 3,458 consisting of 1,772 males and 1,686 females. There were 389 children ages 0-6.

References

Villages in Dharwad district